Stanley M. Noszka (September 19, 1920 – November 15, 1991) was a member of the Pennsylvania State Senate, serving from 1967 to 1978. He was also a professional basketball player in the 1940s. Noszka played for the Youngstown Bears in the National Basketball League during 1945–46, and in the Basketball Association of America for the Pittsburgh Ironmen (1946–47) and Boston Celtics (1947–48).

BAA career statistics

Regular season

Playoffs

References

External links

1920 births
1991 deaths
20th-century American politicians
American men's basketball players
Basketball players from Pittsburgh
Boston Celtics players
Duquesne Dukes men's basketball players
Guards (basketball)
Democratic Party Pennsylvania state senators
Pittsburgh Ironmen players
Youngstown Bears players